Marron William Fort (1906–1961) was a chemist who was the first African-American to receive a Ph.D. in any engineering field.  He also was the first African-American to earn a doctorate from the Massachusetts Institute of Technology, graduating with a Ph.D. in chemical engineering in 1933.

Early life and education
Born in Cambridge, Massachusetts, in 1906, Fort attended Cambridge High and Latin School, graduating on June 18, 1918. He entered MIT in 1922, graduating with an S.B. in 1926 and an S.M. in 1927, both in electrical engineering. In 1933, he completed a Ph.D. in the Department of Chemistry with a dissertation entitled, "Heat of Dilution of Hydrochloric Acid by Continuous Flow Calorimetry."

Career
During World War II, Fort served as chief chemist and plant superintendent of H. and G. J. Caldwell Company in Massachusetts.  In 1954, he joined the chemical industries staff at the Advisory Bureau for Commerce of the U.S. Department of Commerce, serving in Tel Aviv, Israel, making him the highest ranked African-American appointed to a governmental technical post in a foreign country at that time. In 1957, he joined the International Cooperation Administration, an agency of the U.S. Department of State, and then served as deputy chief on the Industrial and Transportation Division, U.S. Operations Mission, of the International Co-op Administration at Ankara, Turkey, until 1959. He became chief of this same division in Pakistan until 1961 when he returned to Washington, D.C., with the Department of State.

Death and legacy
Fort died in Washington on September 18, 1961 and was buried in Arlington National Cemetery.

In 1973, MIT established a graduate fellowship in Fort's honor. The Fort Fellowship was awarded to "the most promising senior minority student who has been accepted for graduate study at M.I.T."

References

African-American chemists
20th-century American chemists
Massachusetts Institute of Technology School of Science alumni
1906 births
1961 deaths
Burials at Arlington National Cemetery
Cambridge Rindge and Latin School alumni
MIT School of Engineering alumni
20th-century African-American scientists